William Augustus Conway (1789–1828) was an English actor.

Biography
Conway was educated for the bar, but appeared on the stage at the Haymarket Theatre, in London, terminated a three years' engagement in 1816, starred till 1821, and went to the United States in 1823. He appeared as Hamlet and in other tragic roles in New York City and Philadelphia, visited the western and southern cities, took passage early in 1828 for Savannah, Georgia, and threw himself into the sea off Charleston Bar while on the voyage.

Conway won the affections of Hester Piozzi, whose letters to him were published in 1843. As Coriolanus he was considered to have been excelled by John Philip Kemble alone.  His son, Frederick B. Conway, was also an actor.

References

Attribution
 

1789 births
1828 deaths
American male Shakespearean actors
American male stage actors
English male Shakespearean actors
1820s suicides
Suicides by drowning in the United States
Male actors from London
19th-century English male actors
English male stage actors
19th-century American male actors